Amata cantori is a moth in the genus Amata (or Syntomis) of the subfamily Arctiinae ("woolly bears" or "tiger moths"). The species was first described by Frederic Moore in 1859. It is found on Peninsular Malaysia and Borneo.

References 

Moths described in 1859
cantori
Moths of Asia